Lac Baker is a civil parish in Madawaska County, New Brunswick, Canada.

For governance purposes it is divided between the village of Lac Baker and the incorporated rural community of Haut-Madawaska, both of which are members of the Northwest Regional Service Commission (NWRSC).

Origin of name
The parish takes its name from Baker Lake, which takes its name from John Baker, an American leader in the Aroostook War.  Baker remained in the area after the boundary settlement awarded the area to New Brunswick.

History
Lac Baker was erected as Baker Lake in 1912 from Clair Parish; the boundary was slightly altered later that year.

The parish was renamed Lac Baker and its boundaries affected by the major reorganisation of Madawaska County parish lines in 1946.

Boundaries
Lac Baker Parish is bounded:

on the northwest by the Quebec provincial border;
on the northeast and east, running entirely along grant lines, beginning on the provincial border at the eastern line of a grant on the eastern side of Lac Baker and running southeasterly along the Lac Baker grants to the northwestern line of Range Five of the Nadeau Settlement, near Baker-Brook River, then northeasterly to the northeastern line of Range Five, then southeasterly to the northwestern line of a grant in Range Four of Nadeau Settlement, about 550 metres southeast of Baker-Brook River, then northeasterly to the northeastern line of Range Four, then southeasterly past the end of Range Four to the northernmost corner of a grant to Maxime Cloutier, about 500 metres northeast of Morneault Road, then southwesterly along the southeastern line of the Cloutier grant and a grant to Thomas Ouellette, running partially along Chemin du Lac, to the southernmost corner of the Ouellette grant, then southeasterly along the northeastern line of a grant straddling Chemin du Lac, to the northern line of a grant on the eastern side of Caron Brook, then easterly to the northeastern corner of the grant, then southerly along the Caron Brook grants to the northern line of grants on the Saint John River;
on the south, running entirely along grants lines, beginning at the southeastern corner of the grants east of Caron Brook, running westerly along the northern line of the Saint John River grants to an inland grant on Brown Road, then southwesterly and westerly along two grants on Brown Road to the southern point of Range Two of the Baker Lake Settlement;
on the southwest, running entirely along grant lines, starting on the southern point of Range Two of Baker Lake Settlement and running northwesterly along the southwestern line of Range Two to a point about 1.35 kilometres northwest of Chemin des Long, then southwesterly to the southwestern line of Range Three of Baker Lake Settlement, then northwesterly to the provincial border.

Communities
Communities at least partly within the parish. bold indicates an incorporated municipality; italics indicate a name no longer in official use 
 Concession-des-Ouellette
 Lac Baker
 Boundary (Lac Baker-Nord)
 Portage-du-Lac
 Saint-Castin
 Soucy
 Rang-des-Collin

Bodies of water
Bodies of water at least partly in the parish.
 Baker-Brook River
 Lac à Eugène
 Lac à Lang
 Lac Baker
 Lac Caron

Islands
Islands at least partly in the parish.
 Île à Caron
 Île de Lac-Baker

Census data
Census data refers only to the Census subdivision of the parish, much of which was annexed by the village of Lac Baker in 2008.

Population

Language

See also
List of parishes in New Brunswick

Notes

References

Parishes of Madawaska County, New Brunswick
Local service districts of Madawaska County, New Brunswick